KORQ (96.1 FM) is a commercial radio station broadcasting to the Abilene, Texas, area. KORQ airs a farm/classic country format branded as "Q Country 96.1".

History
On September 11, 2012, the format of 96.1 FM was changed from news/talk "Fox News Abilene" to contemporary hits. The format was moved from KORQ's sister station on 95.1 in Baird, Texas, now KABW "The Wolf".

On June 3, 2020, KORQ changed their format from top 40/CHR to farm/classic country, branded as "Q Country 96.1".

References

External links

ORQ
Radio stations established in 1999
1999 establishments in Texas
Classic country radio stations in the United States